The French Catholic Academy (Académie catholique de France), was first thought in late 2007 early 2008 by a group of academics.

On July 11, 2008, a first meeting was held, bringing together personalities from magazines, associations and faculties. On October 13, 2008, a small committee was held at the Collège des Bernardins in Paris, which decided on the definitive name "Académie catholique de France" and its head office at this address.

In January 2009, the new office was made up of the priest and philosopher Philippe Capelle-Dumont (chairman), the professor of immunologic medicine Edgardo D. Carosella and Father Jean-Robert Armogathe (vice-presidents) and professor and philosopher Pierre Manent organized a first meeting during which the statutes and rules of procedure were adopted.

In March 2009 the first meeting of the "Scientific Council" was held and the first members of the "academic body" were elected. Inspired by the Catholic Academy of Mainz, in Germany, the French Catholic Academy is composed of 70 clerics and laymen. The "academic body" has 84% lay people.

Reasons and motivations of this initiative
Due to the number of scandals perpetuated by a minority of the 20th century clergy and the growing Republican anti-Catholic feeling in France, Nathalie Nabert, medievalist and poet, honorary dean of the Faculty of Letters of the Catholic Institute of Paris, a member of the "academic body", admits that his commitment is a courageous challenge. However, she adds that the creation of a "Catholic Academy of France", supported by the Faculty of Catholic Theology and the French School of Jerusalem (École biblique et archéologique française de Jerusalem), is a serious and urgent matter.

Indeed, the death of René Rémond appeared to some as the end of the "Catholic intellectual". There were no longer any spaces for discussion where men of faith and combat had opposed torture in Algeria during the war. Rémond was one of those Catholics engaged in political life who ensured a triple mediation between the Church, the Catholic laity and the secularized society. René Rémond himself alarmed as early as 2000 of the silence of Catholic intellectuals in public debate.

The creation of the "Académie catholique de France" therefore responds to a need: to work to transmit the Christian heritage, to be open and creative.

References

Learned societies of France
Organizations established in 2008
2008 establishments in France